Tomáš Janotka (born 4 March 1982) is a Czech football player who plays for FC Zbrojovka Brno on loan from Sigma Olomouc.

Honours 
SK Sigma Olomouc
 Czech Cup: 2011–12
 Czech Supercup: 2012

References

External links
 Profile at fczbrno.cz
 
 Football

1982 births
Living people
Footballers from Brno
Czech footballers
Czech First League players
SK Sigma Olomouc players

Association football midfielders